The 1962 Tangerine Bowl was an American college football bowl game played on December 22, 1962 at the Tangerine Bowl stadium in Orlando, Florida.  The Miami Redskins (based in Oxford, Ohio and now the Miami RedHawks) with a record of 8–1–1 played the Houston Cougars with a record of 6–4. Houston won the game, by a score of 49–21.

Background
In his 7th (and final) season at Miami, Pont led the Redskins to their first bowl game since 1951. After serving as an assistant coach for eight seasons at Michigan State, Yeoman had been hired to coach Houston in 1962. He led them to their first bowl game since 1952.

Game summary
 Miami – Myers 9 yard touchdown pass from Ernie Kellerman (Jenckskick), 9:08 remaining in the 1st quarter 
 Houston – Joe Lopasky 3 yard touchdown run (McMillan kick), 2:14 remaining in the 1st quarter
 Houston – Bobby Brezina 1 yard touchdown run (McMillan kick), 11:40 remaining in the 2nd quarter
 Houston – Bobby Brezina 44 yard touchdown pass from Roland (McMillan kick), 5:51 remaining in the 2nd quarter
 Houston – Joe Lopasky 70 punt yard touchdown return (McMillan kick), 3:58 remaining in the 2nd quarter 
 Houston – Bill McMillan 4 yard touchdown pass from Billy Roland (McMillan kick), 0:18 remaining in the 2nd quarter
 Miami – Ernie Kellerman 1 yard touchdown run (Jenckskick), 4:50 remaining in the 3rd quarter
 Houston – Joe Lopasky 4 yard touchdown run (McMillan kick), 1:14 remaining in the 3rd quarter
 Miami – Neumeier 11 yard touchdown run (Jenckskick), 12:14 remaining in the 4th quarter
 Houston – Joe Lopasky 14 yard touchdown pass from Billy Roland (McMillan kick), 6:15 remaining in the 4th quarter
Billy Roland threw 11-of-17 for 199 yards and 3 touchdowns, and Joe Lopasky caught 3 passes for 81 yards while scoring four touchdowns, with Roland being named MVP of the game.

Aftermath
Pont left for Yale after the game ended. Miami (despite winning the MAC in 1965) would not be in a bowl game until 1973. Houston would soon utilize the Veer offense near the end of the decade, particularly in their next bowl game in 1969.

Statistics

References

Tangerine Bowl
Citrus Bowl (game)
Houston Cougars football bowl games
Miami RedHawks football bowl games
Tangerine Bowl
Tangerine Bowl